Meya Bizer (born May 10, 1993) is an American rugby union and sevens player.

Biography 
Bizer participated in football, lacrosse, track and field and soccer in high school. It was here that she was introduced to rugby. She has a bachelor's degree in psychology.

Bizer made her debut for the United States against France in 2012. She made her international sevens debut for the Eagles sevens team in the Sevens Series at the 2013 Guangzhou Sevens. She was selected for the Eagles squad for the 2014 Women's Rugby World Cup in France.

Bizer was named in the Eagles squad for the 2022 Pacific Four Series in New Zealand. She was named in the Eagles fifteens squad to the 2021 Rugby World Cup in New Zealand.

Bizer signed with the DMP Sharks for the 2022/2023 season.

References

External links 

 Eagles Profile

Living people
1993 births
Female rugby union players
American female rugby union players
United States women's international rugby union players
American female rugby sevens players